George William Basil is an American actor and producer.

Early life
Basil grew up outside Baltimore in Essex. After his family moved to Greece, being of age he stayed and worked briefly as a chef after graduating high school.

After seeing a flyer for the Big Stinkin' International Improv & Sketch Comedy Festival, Basil moved to Austin. There he worked as a bartender and at a pirate radio station. He took an improv class which inspired him to move to New York City.

In NYC, Basil studied at Magnet Theater. For money, he worked at the Apple store, before he began getting acting work.

Career

As an actor Basil is best-known for such films as Werewolves Within and television roles in series such as Flaked, Wrecked, and Crashing.

Personal life
Basil has one daughter and resides in Highland Park.

Filmography

Film

Television

References

External links

American male film actors
American male television actors
Living people
21st-century American male actors
Year of birth missing (living people)